Austerlitz is an unincorporated community in Bourbon County, Kentucky, United States.

It is located along Kentucky Route 57 approximately nine miles south of Paris, Kentucky and 17 miles east of Lexington.   It was location of a former station of the Kentucky Central Railroad (which later became part of the Louisville and Nashville Railroad), along the section of line that runs between Paris and Winchester.

The name of the community likely commemorates the Battle of Austerlitz.   A post office operated in the community from 1884 to 1954.

References

Unincorporated communities in Bourbon County, Kentucky
Unincorporated communities in Kentucky